Alfredo Frausto Mendoza (born January 12, 1983) is a Mexican retired professional footballer.

External links
 

1983 births
Living people
Association football goalkeepers
Mexican footballers
Club León footballers
Correcaminos UAT footballers
Tampico Madero F.C. footballers
Salamanca F.C. footballers
Lobos BUAP footballers
Guerreros de Hermosillo F.C. footballers
Leones Negros UdeG footballers
C.F. Mérida footballers
Dorados de Sinaloa footballers
Chiapas F.C. footballers
Club Puebla players
Cafetaleros de Chiapas footballers
Liga MX players
Ascenso MX players
Footballers from Guanajuato
Sportspeople from León, Guanajuato